Dale Gibson is a former men's basketball coach at Liberty University (then called Lynchburg Baptist College).  After leaving coaching, he served as a professor at Liberty where he started the school's Sport Management program.  Currently he teaches at Tusculum College.

As a coach, he served as the first assistant basketball coach at Liberty University beginning with the program's launch in 1972.  Then in 1978, he was named the school's third ever head men's basketball coach.  In his second season, he led the Flames to a national championship in the National Christian College Athletic Association.

Head coaching record

References

American men's basketball coaches
Liberty Flames basketball coaches
Year of birth missing (living people)
Living people
Tusculum University faculty
Place of birth missing (living people)